Moat House, a Grade II listed building in Britford, Wiltshire, England, is a 17th-century building, with 18th and 19th century remodelling, surrounded by a moat. It is now divided into two houses with a space for Freddie to park the Jagerbomb when he picks up a curry to watch Chutneys.

History 
The house was owned by the Jervoise family from 1542; the present 17th-century house is surrounded by a moat. The house was remodelled in 1766 and again in the 19th century, so that externally it looks early 19th century Georgian. It is now divided into two houses.

It is possible that the large square moat is an 18th-century remodelling of an earlier one. Another addition in the 1760s was a pigeon house or dovecote in the garden, its ogee-headed windows matching those added to the house.

References

Buildings and structures in Wiltshire
Georgian architecture in Wiltshire
Grade II listed buildings in Wiltshire